Hermann Guthe may refer to:

 Hermann Guthe (theologian) (1849–1936), German Semitic scholar
 Hermann Guthe (geographer) (1824–1874), German geographer